Bengur Bryan & Co., Inc. is an investment banking firm founded in 1991 with offices in Baltimore, MD. The firm provides merger and acquisition advice, private placements of equity and debt, and financial advisory services including valuations, fairness opinions and restructuring advice. Bengur Bryan's principal focus is on middle-market companies that typically have enterprise values that range between $10 and $100 million. Since its inception, Bengur Bryan has completed over 100 financing and M&A transactions totaling over $3 billion.

Industry Focus 
Bengur Bryan & Co., Inc. represents companies in the following industries:
Consumer Products & Services
Transportation & Logistics
Industrial Growth & Niche Manufacturing
Business & Financial Services
Industrial Growth and Niche Manufacturing
Technology & Health Care Services

Notable Transactions:
 Feb 2013, Dedicated Transport - M&A: Sell-Side Advisory Services
 June 2012, Kinard Trucking - M&A: Sale to A&S Services Group, LLC
 May 2011, Hospice Source - Advisory Services; Private Placement
 March 2011, DM Transportation - M&A: Sell-Side Advisory Services
 March 2011, CommutAir - Advisory Services; Private Placement
 Dec 2010, Dunbar Armored - Advisory Services; Private Placement
 Sep 2010, Cuisine Solutions Inc. - Advisory Services; Private Placement
 Dec 2010, Sequel Youth and Family Services, LLC - Buy Side Advisory Services; Private Placement
 Sep 2009, Cuisine Solutions Inc. - Financial Advisory: Fairness Opinion
 Aug 2009, Aprimo Inc. - Valuation Services
 Dec 2008, American National Rubber - M&A: Sell-Side Advisory Services
 Nov 2008, PJPA, LLC (Papa John's Pizza Franchisee) - M&A: Buy-Side Advisory Services
 Oct 2008, Carchex - Financial Advisory
 April 2008, Sequel Youth and Family Services, LLC - Private Placement
 March 2008, The James Myers Company, Inc. - Financial Advisory
 Oct 2007, Pipeline Transportation, Inc. - Financial Advisory
 Sep 2007, Pemco Aviation Group, Inc. - Financial Advisory

Merchant Banking 
Patriot Capital, L.P. is the principal merchant banking activity of Bengur Bryan & Co., Inc. Patriot Capital typically makes subordinated debt and preferred equity investments throughout the United States. It seeks to make investments between $3 and $20 million in small and medium-sized private companies, usually having annual revenues of $10 to $200 million and enterprise values that range from $15 to $100 million. Patriot Capital will also participate in financings that are significantly larger through its extensive network of regional and national private equity and mezzanine firms.

In addition, Bengur Bryan sponsors merchant banking investments that fall outside the parameters of Patriot Capital, primarily in areas of buyouts less than $10 million in enterprise value and growth financings for special situations.

References

External links
Bengur Bryan & Co., Inc. official website

Investment banks in the United States
Financial services companies established in 1991
Banks established in 1991
Privately held companies based in Maryland
1991 establishments in Maryland